Commander of the Army may refer to:
Commander of the Army (Kyrgyzstan)
Commander of the Army (Republic of China)
Commander of the Army (Sri Lanka)

See also
Commander of the Army of the Lord